BeiDou is a Chinese satellite navigation system, named after the Chinese name of the Big Dipper.

Beidou may also refer to:

 Beidou, Changhua (北斗鎮), an urban township in Changhua County, Taiwan
 Beidou, Fengshun County, in  Guangdong.

See also
 Baidu, a Chinese web company
 Beidou, a fictional character from Genshin Impact
 Beidu (disambiguation)